Christian B.S. Van Eyken (born  in Etterbeek) is a Belgian politician who represented the Union des Francophones in the Flemish Parliament from 1995 to 2019.

Biography 
Van Eyken was born in the town of Etterbeek in the Brussels Capital Region in 1954. He studied at the Athénée royal de Bruxelles and the Université libre de Bruxelles, where he majored in German studies. Upon graduation in 1978, Van Eyken worked as a teacher and later as a translator for the Brussels government. 

He began his political career in 1983, when he became a community councilor in the town of Linkebeek, a position he held until 2006. In Linkebeek, he would serve as both the Échevin and the Mayor.

In the first direct elections to the Flemish Parliament in 1995, Van Eyken was elected to the regional parliament as a member of the Union des Francophones for the Halle-Vilvoorde constituency. He would serve in that role until 2019, when he chose not to run again.

Between 2007 and 2012, Van Eyken served as a local councilor and member of the police council for the town of Tervuren.

Marc Dellea Affair 
On 8 July 2014, a coffee trader named Marc Dellea was found dead in his bed at the age of 45. His wife, Sylvia Boigelot, called the authorities following his death. A family doctor concluded that Dellea's death was by natural causes, but two days later a medical examiner found a small projectile in his brain, fired (according to ballistics experts) by a small defensive weapon. Investigators who were looking at surveillance footage from security cameras installed in the couple's home found that Sylvia Boigelot and Christian Van Eyken had entered the building on the evening of 6 July shortly before Dellea, and Dellea was the only one who did not leave the house. 

On 27 January 2016, prosecutors in Brussels issued an arrest warrant for Boigelot, Van Eyken's parliamentary assistant and his mistress. Van Eyken denied any involvement in the case. 

In an interview with Le Soir, Olivier Maingain, leader of the Francophone party DéFI, announced that Van Eyken had been suspended since 6 January 2016 concurrently with his parliamentary immunity being lifted. Van Eyken was released from custody on 28 January following a procedural error. According to reports, the judge in the case had failed to sign Van Eyken's arrest warrant.

His trial began in March 2018, after being delayed due to technical errors. The trial began with a procedural hearing involving whether the court had jurisdiction to try the case, and also concerned defense counsel's ability to look over evidence, including the surveillance tapes from the evening in question.

On 3 September 2019, Van Eyken and Boigelot were found guilty of the murder of Marc Dellea and sentenced to 23 years in prison. Van Eyken and his wife appealed the verdict, and the case remains in the appeals court.  On  27 April 2022 Van Eyken was sentenced to 20 years and Boigelot to 22 years imprisonment.

Awards and decorations 
 Van Eyken was a recipient of the Palme d'or of the Ordre de la Couronne

References

External links 
 His profile in the Flemish Parliament

DéFI politicians
Members of the Flemish Parliament
Belgian people convicted of murder
1954 births
People from Etterbeek
Living people
People convicted of murder by Belgium